

Cylburn Arboretum  [pronounced sil·brn aar·br·ee·tm]  is a city park with arboretum and gardens, located at 4915 Greenspring Avenue, Baltimore, Maryland. It is open daily  excluding Mondays  without charge.

The arboretum began as the private estate of businessman Jesse Tyson, who started construction of Cylburn Mansion in 1863. The house, designed by Baltimore City Hall architect George Aloysius Frederick, was eventually completed in 1888 and remains intact, a stone structure built of gneiss from Tyson's quarries at Bare Hills, with mansard roof, tower, and an Italianate cupola. It became the Cylburn Wildflower Preserve and Garden Center in 1954 and, in 1982, was renamed the Cylburn Arboretum Association.

The Cylburn Mansion houses a display of watercolor paintings of Maryland wildflowers that is open to the public.

Today the arboretum contains an extensive collection of trees and woody shrubs based loosely on the Tysons' original plantings. Collections include azaleas, bamboo, beeches, boxwoods, chestnuts, conifers, hollies, Japanese maples, magnolias, maples, Maryland oaks, and viburnum.

The arboretum also includes a number of flower and vegetable gardens, as well as greenhouses designed and built in the 1960s by Lord & Burnham. The greenhouses grow plants for the city's parks, and are not open to the general public.

The arboretum is included in the Baltimore National Heritage Area.

It was used as a filming location for "Final Grades", a 2006 episode of The Wire, in which Bodie Broadus and Jimmy McNulty have a conversation in the park.

See also 
 Mt. Washington Arboretum
 List of botanical gardens in the United States

References

External links 

 Cylburn Arboretum Association
 George A Frederick website
, including photo from 2006, at Maryland Historical Trust

Arboreta in Maryland
Botanical gardens in Maryland
Museums in Baltimore
Natural history museums in Maryland
Nature centers in Maryland
Baltimore National Heritage Area
Parks in Baltimore
Historic districts on the National Register of Historic Places in Baltimore
Baltimore City Landmarks